World Cargo Airlines is a rebranding of the formerly known Pos Asia Cargo Express Sdn Bhd or more popularly known in its abbreviation as “POS ACE". It is an airline company in Malaysia holding an approved AOC for the operation of cargo aircraft under the purview of the Civil Aviation Authority of Malaysia (CAAM). Currently, they operate 1 Boeing 737-400F to the East Malaysia cities of Kuching, Miri, Kota Kinabalu, Tawau and Sibu as well as cities in Peninsular Malaysia such as Johor Bahru, Pulau Pinang and Kota Bharu. Its second aircraft, the first Boeing 737-800F in South East Asia, begun operations on 23 March 2021. Its third aircraft, a Boeing 737-300 (9M-WCM) begun operations in November 2021.

History

Prior to its recent rebranding in 2020, POS ACE was a 100% subsidiary of POS Malaysia Berhad, the national postal company of Malaysia. Pos Malaysia have, over many decades, outsourced the delivery of its mails and parcels to East Malaysian sectors from Kuala Lumpur and other Peninsula Malaysia states to freighter operators and commercial carriers.

Since the late 80s and 90s, Transmile Air was contracted to operate 2 Boeing narrow body freighter aircraft for this purpose. Over spilt cargos were loaded on board commercial flights including Malaysia Airlines and others operating the East Malaysian routes of Sabah and Sarawak. This operation takes place on a daily basis almost 24/7 and 365 days a year. Sometime in 2007, a new operator called Gading Sari Aviation took the stage and secured the same contract from Transmile Air. Gading Sari operated the same routes for Pos Malaysia until sometime in 2013 when Pos Malaysia, under the direction of its parent company DRB HICOM, decided to buy over Gading Sari Aviation and operate the airline as its own subsidiary. A rebranding took place after the completion of that full acquisition. The airline was named POS ACE after that.

POS ACE had leased 2 units of B737-400F from an American lessor and operated it for 6 years until such time in 2019 when Asia Cargo Network Sdn Bhd ("ACN") was selected to provide the lease of 2 units of the same model of aircraft to replace the expiry of the previous lease from the American operator. The replacement aircraft was delivered to POS ACE in mid 2019. Later on, during the 4th quarter of 2019, POS Malaysia decided to appoint ACN as the Manager of POS ACE. Hence, in addition to the leasing contract of the freighter aircraft to POS ACE as mentioned earlier on, ACN was then appointed to manage POS ACE i.e. the total management of the airline company.

Pursuant to the success of POS ACE under its management, ACN was then offered the privilege to partner with POS Malaysia and acquire 51% (majority) shareholding stake in POS ACE. The signing of the Acquisition was made on the 19th of August 2020 making ACN the 51% shareholder of POS ACE and a partner to the esteemed Pos Malaysia Berhad. POS ACE hence went through a second rebranding and this time was named World Cargo Airline Sdn Bhd.

Destinations

 Kuala Lumpur - Kuala Lumpur International Airport (Main Hub)
 Kuching-Kuching International Airport
 Miri - Miri Airport
 Kota Kinabalu - Kota Kinabalu International Airport
 Tawau - Tawau Airport
 Sibu - Sibu Airport 
 Johor Bahru - Senai International Airport 
 Pulau Pinang - Penang International Airport 
 Kota Bharu - Sultan Ismail Petra Airport
 Macau - Macau International Airport
 Ho Chi Minh City - Tan Son Nhat International Airport
 Yangon - Yangon International Airport
 Narita - Narita International Airport
 Phnom Penh - Phnom Penh International Airport
 Kunming - Kunming Changshui International Airport
 Shenzhen - Shenzhen Bao'an International Airport
 Manila - Ninoy Aquino International Airport
 Cebu - Mactan–Cebu International Airport
 Davao - Francisco Bangoy International Airport
 Singapore - Changi International Airport
 Hong Kong - Hong Kong International Airport
 Jakarta - Soekarno-Hatta International Airport

Fleet

Current fleet
The World Cargo Airline fleet consists of the following aircraft (as of June 2021):

Former fleet
The airline operated the following aircraft (as of February 2015):  
 2 Boeing 737-400F (9M-GSA & 9M-GSB)

See also
 MASkargo

References

External links
 

Airlines of Malaysia
Cargo airlines of Malaysia
Privately held companies of Malaysia
Airlines established in 1996
1996 establishments in Malaysia